Ronald M. Taganashi (August 25, 1944 - February 5, 1992) was an American martial arts science philosopher and teacher. Taganashi was the founder of the American-Te Goju-Ryu martial arts system. He also founded the North American Heaven and Earth Society, which encourages students to learn about themselves, their spiritual beliefs, and their art.

Early life and training 
Ronald Moore Taganashi was born August 25, 1944, in Seoul, Korea and grew up in the New York City.  Taganashi was Afro-American; Moore was his American slave name. Taganashi was born into a martial arts family where his father was a Shodan and his mother was a brown belt, which inspired his martial arts training. He began his formal martial arts training at the age of 8 with Kim Son Ree, a 7th degree black belt in Tang Soo Do.  Taganashi obtained a 3rd degree black belt in Tang Soo Do, a 2nd degree black belt in Kempo, and a 5th degree black belt in Goju-Ryu Karate. Additionally, he studied Judo, Aikido, Kendo, and Kung Fu.  Taganashi became a 9th degree black belt in American-Te Goju-Ryu martial arts. He mastered weapons in multiple martial art systems and was an avid tournament fighter. His favorite technique was the flying side kick, which he used as an offensive weapon and an effective counter attack. Taganashi stated that the side kick is “more effective, stronger when used as a counter attack because you’re on a collision course. He’s coming in and you’re striking out. It’s a very strong technique".

History of American-Te Goju-Ryu 
In 1959, Goju-Ryu Karate was brought to the United States by Peter Urban (1944-2004), who trained under Gogen Yamaguchi since 1954. In 1964, Peter Urban founded the U.S.A. Goju Association.  Ronald Taganashi was a student of Peter Urban, along with Frank Ruiz and Harry Rosentein, and together they co-founded the Nisei Goju system in 1969. Taganashi was one of the grand masters that emerged from the Nisei Goju System and proceeded to develop his own fighting system. Taganashi was the founder of America-Te Goju-Ryu, which utilizes Goju-Ryu karate as its foundation and incorporates a wide variety of techniques from Judo, Jujitsu, Aikido, Karate do, Tang Soo Do, Kempo, Kung-Fu and Kobudo. American-Te Goju-Ryu represents Taganashi’s interpretation of martial arts for the 21st century and is intended for practical use. American-Te Kata was created by Taganashi as the signature Kata of American Te Goju-Ryu Karate.

Teaching and philosophy 

Taganashi taught martial arts professionally from 1957 to 1992 during which time he trained 67 students to the level of black belt or beyond.

Ronald Taganashi was part of a second generation of young masters of the American Goju Ryu style that brought neighborhood Karate into New York City. Taganashi lived on Morton Street in Manhattan’s Greenwich Village and organized the Morton Street Karate Club. The Morton Street Karate club was known for making Karate a neighborhood affair by giving free karate lessons to the residents of Morton Street and publishing a monthly “Samurai Newsletter”.

Taganashi founded the North American Heaven and Earth Society, which encourages students to learn about themselves, their spiritual beliefs, and their art. He wrote The North American Heaven and Earth Society (1997), which serves as a manual in which he sets forth some of the lessons in life that he learned on the streets of New York City.  Taganashi taught his students that "Caring is the key and that nothing is impossible to the willing mind."

Bonnie Baker was Dai Senpai under Master Ronald Taganashi for eleven years. Baker currently holds a Hachidan (8th degree) black belt in Goju and a Yondan (4th degree) black belt in Ju-Jutsu.  Baker is the founder of the Columbia University Kon-Do Goju Karate Club.

Media appearances 
Taganashi has appeared in numerous martial arts magazines, film and television. Taganashi appeared on the cover of Official Karate Magazine in May 1975. Taganashi plays himself in the documentary film The Warrior Within (1977) narrated by Chuck Norris, where he represents the philosophy and practice of Goju-Ryu. He is also featured in the documentary film Legends of American Martial Arts (DVD, 2004). Taganashi was interviewed in “Karate Meets Jazz” in "Episode 4" of Black Journal, a television program of the National Educational Television (NET), which was also selected as a short segment featured in the 2018 Smithsonian African American Film Festival.

Death 
Ronald Taganashi died on February 5, 1992, in New York City.

References

External links 

1944 births
1992 deaths
American martial artists
Gōjū-ryū practitioners
American male karateka
People from Seoul